Veivosa Taka (born 18 October 1961) is a Tongan politician and Member of the Legislative Assembly of Tonga. He is a member of the Democratic Party of the Friendly Islands.

Before entering politics Taka was a shipping director, retail manager, and District Officer for Haʻapai. He was first elected to the Legislative Assembly in the 2014 Tongan general election. He was re-elected at the 2017 election. In November 2016 he was appointed Chairman of the Committee of the Whole House.

He was re-elected in the 2021 election. He subsequently supported Siaosi Sovaleni for Prime Minister. While offered a cabinet position, he decided to remain outside cabinet.

References

Living people
Members of the Legislative Assembly of Tonga
Democratic Party of the Friendly Islands politicians
1961 births